Tracey Tan (born 16 July 1976) is a Singaporean sailor. She competed in the Europe event at the 1996 Summer Olympics.

References

External links
 

1976 births
Living people
Singaporean female sailors (sport)
Olympic sailors of Singapore
Sailors at the 1996 Summer Olympics – Europe
Place of birth missing (living people)
Asian Games medalists in sailing
Sailors at the 1998 Asian Games
Medalists at the 1998 Asian Games
Asian Games bronze medalists for Singapore
20th-century Singaporean women